Charlottesville Coca-Cola Bottling Works is a historic Coca-Cola bottling plant located at Charlottesville, Virginia.  It was built in 1939, and is a two-story, reinforced concrete Art Deco style factory faced with brick. It has one-story wing and a detached one-story, 42-truck brick garage supported by steel posts and wood rafters. The design features stepped white cast stone pilaster caps, rising above the coping of the parapet, top the pilasters and corner piers and large industrial style windows.  In 1955 a one-story attached brick addition was made on the east side of the garage providing a bottle and crate storage warehouse. In 1981 a one-story, "L"-shaped warehouse built of cinder blocks was added to the plant.  The building was in use as a production facility until 1973 and then as a Coca-Cola distribution center until 2010.

It was listed on the National Register of Historic Places in 2013.

See also
Winchester Coca-Cola Bottling Works

References

Industrial buildings and structures on the National Register of Historic Places in Virginia
Art Deco architecture in Virginia
Industrial buildings completed in 1939
Buildings and structures in Charlottesville, Virginia
National Register of Historic Places in Charlottesville, Virginia
Coca-Cola buildings and structures
Coca-Cola bottlers
Packaging companies of the United States